The Journal of Aging Studies is a quarterly peer-reviewed scientific journal focused on the study of aging and related topics. Its disciplinary scope is broad, including the social sciences, behavioral sciences and the humanities. It was established in 1987 by Jaber F. Gubrium (University of Missouri), and is published by Elsevier. The editor-in-chief is Renée Lynn Beard (College of the Holy Cross). According to the Journal Citation Reports, the journal has a 2019 impact factor of 2.078.

The Journal of Aging Studies features scholarly articles offering theoretically engaged interpretations that challenge existing theory and empirical work. Articles need not deal with the field of aging as a whole, but with any defensibly relevant topic pertinent to the aging experience and related to the broad concerns and subject matter of the social and behavioral sciences and the humanities. The journal emphasizes innovation and critique - new directions in general - regardless of theoretical or methodological orientation or academic discipline (https://www.sciencedirect.com/journal/journal-of-aging-studies).

References

External links

Publications established in 1987
Quarterly journals
English-language journals
Gerontology journals
Elsevier academic journals